Oliver Goldsmith (10 November 1728 – 4 April 1774) was a well known Anglo-Irish novelist, playwright, dramatist and poet, who is noted for his novel The Vicar of Wakefield (1766), his pastoral poem The Deserted Village (1770), and his plays The Good-Natur'd Man (1768) and She Stoops to Conquer (1771, first performed in 1773). He is thought to have written the classic children's tale The History of Little Goody Two-Shoes (1765).

Biography

Goldsmith's birth date and year are not known with certainty. According to the Library of Congress authority file, he told a biographer that he was born on 10 November 1728. The location of his birthplace is also uncertain. He was born either in the townland of Pallas, near Ballymahon, County Longford, Ireland, where his father was the Anglican curate of the parish of Forgney, or at the residence of his maternal grandparents, at the Smith Hill House near Elphin in County Roscommon, where his grandfather Oliver Jones was a clergyman and master of the Elphin diocesan school, and where Oliver studied. When Goldsmith was two years old, his father was appointed the rector of the parish of "Kilkenny West" in County Westmeath. The family moved to the parsonage at Lissoy, between Athlone and Ballymahon, and continued to live there until his father's death in 1747.

In 1744, Goldsmith went up to Trinity College, Dublin. His tutor was Theaker Wilder. Neglecting his studies in theology and law, he fell to the bottom of his class. In 1747, along with four other undergraduates, he was expelled for a riot in which they attempted to storm the Marshalsea Prison. He was graduated in 1749 as a Bachelor of Arts, but without the discipline or distinction that might have gained him entry to a profession in the church or the law. His education seemed to have given him mainly a taste for fine clothes, playing cards, singing Irish airs, and playing the flute. He lived for a short time with his mother, tried various professions without success, studied medicine desultorily at the University of Edinburgh from 1752 to 1755, and set out on a walking tour of Flanders, France, Switzerland, and Northern Italy, living by his wits (busking with his flute).

He settled in London in 1756, where he briefly held various jobs, including an apothecary's assistant and an usher of a school. Perennially in debt and addicted to gambling, Goldsmith produced a massive output as a hack writer on Grub Street for the publishers of London, but his few painstaking works earned him the company of Samuel Johnson, with whom he was a founding member of "The Club". There, through fellow Club member Edmund Burke, he made the acquaintance of Sir George Savile, who would later arrange a job for him at Thornhill Grammar School. The combination of his literary work and his dissolute lifestyle led Horace Walpole to give him the epithet "inspired idiot". During this period he used the pseudonym "James Willington" (the name of a fellow student at Trinity) to publish his 1758 translation of the autobiography of the Huguenot Jean Marteilhe.

In his 'Life', Washington Irving states that Goldsmith was between 5'4" and 5'6" in height, not heavily built but quite muscular and with rather plain features. In character he had a lively sense of fun, was totally guileless, and never happier than when in the light-hearted company of children. The money that he sporadically earned was often frittered away or happily given away to the next good cause that presented itself so that any financial security tended to be fleeting and short-lived. Goldsmith's talents were unreservedly recognised by Samuel Johnson, whose patronage – somewhat resented by Boswell – aided his eventual recognition in the literary world and the world of drama.

Goldsmith was described by contemporaries as prone to envy, a congenial but impetuous and disorganised personality who once planned to emigrate to America but failed because he missed his ship. At some point around this time he worked at Thornhill Grammar School, later basing Squire Thornhill (in The Vicar of Wakefield) on his benefactor Sir George Savile and certainly spending time with eminent scientist Rev. John Mitchell, whom he probably knew from London. Mitchell sorely missed good company, which Goldsmith naturally provided in spades. Thomas De Quincey wrote of him "All the motion of Goldsmith's nature moved in the direction of the true, the natural, the sweet, the gentle".

His premature death in 1774 may have been partly due to his own misdiagnosis of his kidney infection. Goldsmith was buried in Temple Church in London. The inscription reads; "HERE LIES/OLIVER GOLDSMITH". A monument was originally raised to him at the site of his burial, but this was destroyed in an air raid in 1941. A monument to him survives in the centre of Ballymahon, also in Westminster Abbey with an epitaph written by Samuel Johnson.

Among his papers was found the prospectus of an encyclopedia, to be called the Universal dictionary of the arts and sciences. He wished this to be the British equivalent of the Encyclopédie and it was to include comprehensive articles by Samuel Johnson, Edmund Burke, Adam Smith, Edward Gibbon, Sir Joshua Reynolds, Sir William Jones, Fox and Dr. Burney. The project, however, was not realised due to Goldsmith's death.

Works

The Citizen of the World
In 1760 Goldsmith began to publish a series of letters in the Public Ledger under the title The Citizen of the World. Purportedly written by a Chinese traveller in England by the name of Lien Chi, they used this fictional outsider's perspective to comment ironically and at times moralistically on British society and manners. It was inspired by the earlier essay series Persian Letters by Montesquieu.

The Hermit
Goldsmith wrote this romantic ballad of precisely 160 lines in 1765. The hero and heroine are Edwin, a youth without wealth or power, and Angelina, the daughter of a lord "beside the Tyne". Angelina spurns many wooers, but refuses to make plain her love for young Edwin. "Quite dejected with my scorn", Edwin disappears and becomes a hermit. One day, Angelina turns up at his cell in boy's clothes and, not recognising him, tells him her story. Edwin then reveals his true identity, and the lovers never part again. The poem is notable for its interesting portrayal of a hermit, who is fond of the natural world and his wilderness solitude but maintains a gentle, sympathetic demeanor toward other people. In keeping with eremitical tradition, however, Edwin the Hermit claims to "spurn the [opposite] sex". This poem appears under the title of "A Ballad" sung by the character of Mr. Burchell in Chapter 8 of Goldsmith's novel, The Vicar of Wakefield.

The Deserted Village

In the 1760s Goldsmith witnessed the demolition of an ancient village and destruction of its farms to clear land to become a wealthy man's garden. His poem The Deserted Village, published in 1770, expresses a fear that the destruction of villages and the conversion of land from productive agriculture to ornamental landscape gardens would ruin the peasantry.

Other works
 Account of the Augustan Age in England (1759)
The Life of Richard Nash (Beau Nash) (1762)
 The History of England, from the Earliest Times to the Death of George II in 4 volumes (1771)
 Dr. Goldsmith's Roman History Abridged by Himself for the Use of Schools (1772)
 An History of the Earth and Animated Nature (1774)
 The Complete Poetical Works of Oliver Goldsmith (1887), edited by Austin Dobson
 The Grumbler: An Adaptation (1931), edited by Alice I. Perry Wood

Goldsmith is also thought to have written the classic children's tale The History of Little Goody Two-Shoes.

Religious beliefs
Goldsmith was an Anglican, and famously said "as I take my shoes from the shoemaker, and my coat from the taylor, so I take my religion from the priest."

Thomas Hurst wrote that Goldsmith "recognised with joy the existence and perfections of a Deity. For the Christian revelation also, he was always understood to have a profound respect – knowing that it was the source of our best hopes and noblest expectations".

Memorials concerning Oliver Goldsmith

 Goldsmith lived in Kingsbury, now in north-west London, between 1771 and 1774: Oliver Goldsmith Primary School, Goldsmith Lane, and Goldsmith Avenue there are named after him.
 Goldsmith Road, the Oliver Goldsmith Estate and Oliver Goldsmith Primary School, all in Peckham, are named after him.
 The Oliver Goldsmith Summer School is held every June Bank Holiday at Ballymahon with poetry and creative readings being held at Goldsmith's birthplace in nearby Pallas, Forgney.
 A statue of him by J. H. Foley stands at the Front Arch of Trinity College, Dublin (see image).
 A statue of him stands in a limestone cell at the ruin of his birthplace in Pallas, Forgney, Ballymahon, County Longford. The statue is a copy of the Foley statue that stands outside Trinity college, Dublin and is the focus point of the annual Oliver Goldsmith Summer School.
 His name has been given to a new lecture theatre and student accommodation on the Trinity College campus: Goldsmith Hall.
 Auburn, Alabama, and Auburn University were named for the first line in Goldsmith's poem: "Sweet Auburn, loveliest village of the plain." Auburn is still referred to as the 'loveliest village on the plain.'
 Auburn in Sydney was also named for "Sweet Auburn".
 There is a statue in Ballymahon County Longford outside the town library by Irish Sculptor Éamonn O' Doherty (1939–2011) which was unveiled in 1999.
 London Underground locomotive number 16 (used on the Metropolitan line of the London Underground until 1962) was named Oliver Goldsmith.
 Longford based band Goldsmith are named after the famous writer.
 Athlone Institute of Technology library is named the Goldsmith Library
 In 1870, Goldsmith Street in Phibsborough was renamed after Oliver Goldsmith
 Goldsmith Street in the 'Poets' Corner' area of Elwood, Melbourne is named after Oliver Goldsmith.
 Auburn Hill in Stoneybatter, Dublin is named after the fictional town of Auburn from his poem The Deserted Village.

In popular culture
Two characters in the 1951 comedy The Lavender Hill Mob quote the same line from Goldsmith's poem "The Traveller" – a subtle joke, because the film's plot involves the recasting of stolen gold.

During the opening credits of the SKY One adaptation of Sir Terry Pratchett's Christmas-like story "The Hogfather", a portrait of Goldsmith is shown as part of a hall of memorials to those "inhumed" by the "Ankh-Morpork Assassins' Guild".

In the 1925 novel The Painted Veil by W. Somerset Maugham, the last words of the poem An Elegy on the Death of a Mad Dog, "The dog it was that died", are the dying words of bacteriologist Walter Fane, one of the primary characters in the novel. And using the title "Elegy for a Mad Dog" is an episode of Marcus Welby, M.D. (1971, Season 2, Episode 21).

In the Nabokov novel Pale Fire, a central character's house is situated between "Goldsworth" (the name of an estate) and "Wordsmith University." Crossing these two names yields the names of the poets Wordsworth and Goldsmith; one of the narrators refers to this as the "witty exchange of syllables invoking the two masters of the heroic couplet."

In the play Marx in Soho by Howard Zinn, Marx makes a reference to Goldsmith's poem The Deserted Village.

In The Waste Land, TS Eliot parodies Goldsmith's song When lovely woman stoops to folly.

The characters of 'Edwin' and 'Angelina' in Gilbert and Sullivan's Trial by Jury were a reference to Goldsmith's poem The Hermit.

References

Further reading
 Austin Dobson, Henry (Editor) The Complete Poetical Works of Oliver Goldsmith, 
 Campbell, Gordon (ed.), Oliver Goldsmith (Everyman's Poetry Series), 
 Connellan, J.A., Oliver Goldsmith of Elphin, Published for the Goldsmith Society (1935)
 Forster, John, The life and times of Oliver Goldsmith, Published by: Ward, Lock and Co (London, New York, 1848)
 Goldsmith, Oliver, The Letters of Oliver Goldsmith (Edited by Michael Griffin and David O'Shaughnessy) 
 Goldsmith, Oliver, The Vicar of Wakefield, 
 Goldsmith, Oliver, She Stoops to Conquer, 
 Irving, Washington, Life of Oliver Goldsmith, 
 Prior, James, Life of Goldsmith, two volumes (London: John Murray, 1837) at the Internet Archive
 Rousseau, George (1974), Goldsmith: The Critical Heritage. London: Routledge and Kegan Paul.

External links

 Oliver Goldsmith at the Eighteenth-Century Poetry Archive (ECPA)
 
 
 
 
 Essays by Oliver Goldsmith at Quotidiana.org
 The Deserted Village
 UNCG American Publishers' Trade Bindings: The Deserted Village
 Oliver Goldsmith: A Biography by Washington Irving from Project Gutenberg
 Goldsmith (English Men of Letters series) by William Black from Project Gutenberg
 An Essay on the Theatre; or, A Comparison Between Laughing and Sentimental Comedy
 Goldsmith Hall – student accommodation and lecture theatre, Trinity College, Dublin.
 Information on Goldsmith
 Oliver Goldsmith Resource
 http://www.olivergoldsmithfestival.com The Goldsmith International Literary Festival] Info on the Festival held annually in Goldsmith's Home County
 Poems and essays, Oliver Goldsmith, 1839, (William Smith, London)
 

1728 births
1774 deaths
People from County Longford
People from County Roscommon
Anglo-Irish artists
18th-century Anglo-Irish people
Irish Anglicans
Irish male poets
Irish male novelists
Irish male dramatists and playwrights
Alumni of Trinity College Dublin
Alumni of the University of Edinburgh
Streathamites
18th-century Irish novelists
18th-century Irish poets
18th-century Irish male writers
18th-century Irish dramatists and playwrights
Irish essayists